Henrik Lönnberg (27 April 1896 – 28 December 1974) was a Swedish sports shooter. He competed in the 25 m pistol event at the 1936 Summer Olympics.

References

External links
 

1896 births
1974 deaths
Swedish male sport shooters
Olympic shooters of Sweden
Shooters at the 1936 Summer Olympics
People from Ljusdal Municipality
Sportspeople from Gävleborg County
20th-century Swedish people